Karl Evert "Keve" Hjelm (23 June 1922 – 3 February 2004) was a Swedish actor and film director. He appeared in 70 films between 1943 and 2004. At the 1st Guldbagge Awards he won the award for Best Actor for his role in Raven's End. At the 15th Guldbagge Awards he won the Special Achievement award.

In 1946, Hjelm married Ingrid Håkanson (born 1922), daughter of merchant Emil Håkanson and Frida, née Westerberg. He was the father of Åsa-Lena (born 1947), Kåre (born 1951), Ola (born 1953) and Matti (born 1960).

Selected filmography

 Det spökar - det spökar ... (1943) - Young man entering the beauty parlor (uncredited)
 Natt i hamn (1943) - Young man at 'Kontinenten' (uncredited)
 När ängarna blommar (1946) - Farm worker (uncredited)
 Krigsmans erinran (1947) - Stableman (uncredited)
 The Girl from the Marsh Croft (1947) - Johan
 Rail Workers (1947) - Natan (uncredited)
 On These Shoulders (1948) - Simon Loväng
 The Street (1949) - Rudolf 'Rulle' Malm
 Kvinnan som försvann (1949) - Göran Arnolds
 Girl with Hyacinths (1950) - Capt. Brink - Dagmar's Husband
 Sköna Helena (1951) - Lager Myrten
 Flottans glada gossar (1954) - Drunk Englishman (uncredited)
 A Lesson in Love (1954) - Guest at Wedding (uncredited)
 Night Child (1956) - Berra (uncredited)
 A Dreamer's Journey (1957) - Karl-Anton
 Never in Your Life (1957) - Rabatten
 We at Väddö (1958) - Daniel Sundberg
 Hide and Seek (1963) - Sosostro
 Mordvapen till salu (1963) - Ralph Hökmosse
 Raven's End (1963) - The Father
 Love 65 (1965) - Keve
 Night Games (1966) - Jan
 Life's Just Great (1967) - Roland
 Roseanna (1967) - Martin Beck
 Bränt barn (1967) - Knut Lundin
 Vindingevals (1968) - The Man
 Fanny Hill (1968) - Leif Henning
 Som natt och dag (1969) - Prof. Erland Roos
 Grisjakten (1970) - Sivert Gård
 Nana (1970) - Von Falke
 Brother Carl (1971) - Martin Ericsson
  (1971)
 Ungkarlshotellet (1975) - Göte Löv
 Fru Inger til Østråt (1975) - Jens Bjelke
 Hello Baby (1976) - Director
 Bluff Stop (1977) - Erland
 Min älskade (1979) - Bernard
 Blomstrande tider (1980) - Henry
 Limpan (1983) - Farmer
 Svarta fåglar (1983) - Lindtner
 Rainfox (1984) - John Ericson
 Den frusna leoparden (1986) - The Father
 Hud (1986) - Sigurd - Vilde's Stepfather
 Creditors (1988) - Gustav
 1939 (1989) - Alfred Hall
 Måker (1991) - Even
 The Best Intentions (1992) - Fredrik Bergman
 Hører du ikke hva jeg sier! (1995) - Goran
 Nu är pappa trött igen (1996) - Kökschefen
 Svenska hjältar (1997) - Egon
 Dykaren (2000) - Gösta
 Blodsbröder (2005) - Old art dealer

References

External links

1922 births
2004 deaths
People from Gnesta Municipality
Swedish male film actors
Swedish film directors
Deaths from prostate cancer
Deaths from cancer in Sweden
Eugene O'Neill Award winners
Best Actor Guldbagge Award winners
20th-century Swedish male actors
21st-century Swedish male actors